Dendrelaphis punctulatus, also known commonly as the Australian tree snake, the common tree snake, and the green tree snake, is a species of slender, large-eyed, diurnal, non-venomous snake in the family Colubridae. The species is native to many parts of Australia, especially in the northern and eastern coastal areas, and to Papua New Guinea.

It is readily recognised as it is an agile snake with a very slender body and tail. The dorsal body colour varies from golden yellow, to bright green, to olive-green, to black, sometimes even blue. It is frequently pale yellow on the throat and belly, but other pale colours have been noted. Blue flecks are present on the flanks. The eyes are large, with typically golden-coloured irises and large round pupils. 

It is found in a variety of habitats ranging from rainforest to woodland to urban areas where it preys on fish, frogs, and other small animals.

It is a non-venomous species and does not constrict its prey, but rather relies on its sharp, angled teeth to 'chew' its prey down the oesophagus.

Description
It has 24–26 maxillary teeth. The dorsal scales are arranged in 13 rows at midbody. The ventrals number 191–220. The anal plate is divided. The subcaudals, which are also divided, number 120–144.

Distribution and habitat
D. punctulatus is common in Australia's northern tropics and eastern Australia.  It is also found from the Kimberley region (Western Australia) to Cape York and Torres Strait (Queensland), extending down the east coast into New South Wales, and north into Papua New Guinea.

The common tree snake lives in a wide variety of habitats, including:  bushland; well vegetated banks of rivers, creeks and streams; rainforest edges; eucalypt forests; heathland and areas with trees, long grass, and lush vegetation – especially near water.

Behaviour
When D. punctulatus is near water it often looks for long grass, blending in to hide while watching for its prey to come to nearby rocks or banks to bask or play. It will also enter house gardens that have fountains or ponds surrounded by long grass or shrubs. It is active during the day, and rests at night in hollow trees, logs, foliage, or rock crevices. It is often found resting in trees; hence the name "tree snake".

Feeding
Frogs, water skinks, and small reptiles and their eggs form a large part of the common tree snake's diet, but it will also eat small fish, mammals, geckos, and turtle hatchlings.

Reproduction
An oviparous species, the common tree snake lays 5–12 elongated eggs per clutch.

Defensive behaviour
Although D. punctulatus is essentially harmless to humans, it will defend itself by producing a horrible odour from its cloaca, and may bite. Sometimes when approached, the snake inflates its body and neck to make itself seem larger, a tactic sometimes used to scare predators. Generally, however, the green tree snake in the wild will make a quick escape when it feels threatened.

References

Further reading
Cogger HG (2014). Reptiles and Amphibians of Australia, Seventh Edition. Clayton, Victoria, Australia: CSIRO Publishing. xxx + 1,033 pp. .
Fearn S, Trembath DF (2010). "Natural history of the common tree snake, Dendrelaphis punctulatus (Serpentes: Colubridae), in the wet–dry tropics of north Queensland". Australian Journal of Zoology 58 (6): 384–389.
Gray JE (1827). "Reptilia". Appendix. pp. 424–434. In: King PP (1826). Narrative of a Survey of the Intertropical and Western Coasts of Australia Performed between the Years 1818 and 1822. With an Appendix, Containing Various Subjects Relating to Hydrography and Natural History. Volume II. London: John Murray. viii + 637 pp. + Plates A–C + Errata. (Leptophis punctulatus, new species, pp. 432–433). (in English and Latin).
van Rooijen J, Vogel G, Somaweera R (2015). "A revised taxonomy of the Australo-Papuan species of the colubrid genus Dendrelaphis (Serpentes: Colubridae)". Salamandra 51 (1): 33–56. (Dendrelaphis punctulatus, pp. 50–51, Figure 11A).
Wilson S, Swan G (2013). A Complete Guide to Reptiles of Australia, Fourth Edition. Sydney: New Holland Publishers. 522 pp. .

External links
Common or Green Tree Snake video
Wild herps
Environmental Protection Agency

Colubrids
Reptiles of Oceania
Reptiles of Papua New Guinea
Reptiles of Western Australia
Least concern biota of Oceania
Reptiles described in 1827
Reptiles of Queensland
Reptiles of New South Wales
Snakes of Australia
punctulatus
Snakes of New Guinea